Saskadena Six (formerly Suicide Six) is a ski resort in South Pomfret, Vermont. Its claim to historical fame as the earliest ski resort derives from the installation, in January 1934, of an improvised rope tow, the first in the United States, on a hill located on Clinton Gilbert's farm. The rope tow was originally powered with a Ford Model T engine. By the following month, Wallace "Bunny" Bertram (a former ski coach at Dartmouth College who had helped build the original rope lift) took over the operation, and installed a more reliable electric motor. A few years later he moved his operation to a steeper hill nearby, shown on the map as "Hill 6". Bertram once joked that to ski down the nearby  would be suicide. Two years later the resort was opened using this name and photos of Bertram can be seen in the resort museum in the base lodge. Devotees of ski mountaineering and backcountry skiing mark this as the beginning of the divergence of resort skiing and traditional backcountry skiing.

Suicide Six was the location of the first National Snow Surfing Championships in 1982, considered an important event in the development of snowboarding as a sport, which later would become the U.S. Open Snowboarding Championships.

Bunny Bertram sold Suicide Six to Laurance Rockefeller in 1961, and the development continued of the ski resort in conjunction with Rockefeller's nearby Woodstock Inn. In a 2004 article, the Boston Globe described Suicide Six as "steeped in history", and now a "low key" location for "a taste of rural skiing". As of late 2011, when Suicide Six marked its 75th anniversary, the facility included 23 runs and continued to operate as the ski area of the Woodstock Inn. In 2018, the mountain had developed summer programs, and opened a lift-served mountain bike park, only the 6th such park in the state of Vermont. In 2020, the lift served mountain biking was ceased, but the area is open to the public to park and ride up/down as they please. Maintenance of the MTB trails has been assumed by the Woodstock Area Mountain Bike Association (WAMBA). The continued investment and development into the area as a year-round destination continues to add vibrance and activities to the region in the heart of the Green Mountains

Suicide Six is host to the longest running ski race in North America, The Fisk Trophy Race. It was first held in 1937 and is a rite of passage for serious eastern ski racers. Notable past winners include Bode Miller, Chip Knight, Jimmy Cochran, Shane McConkey, and many other Olympians, US Ski Team members, and NCAA Champions.

On June 28th, 2022, the ski area announced on their website that they would be retiring the Suicide Six name.

References

External links
 
 
 
 

Ski areas and resorts in Vermont
Woodstock, Vermont
Tourist attractions in Windsor County, Vermont
Buildings and structures in Woodstock, Vermont